Frederic Alan Schepisi  (born 26 December 1939) is an Australian film director, producer and screenwriter. His credits include The Chant of Jimmie Blacksmith,   Plenty, Roxanne, A Cry in the Dark, Mr. Baseball, Six Degrees of Separation, and Last Orders.

Life and career
Frederic Alan Schepisi was born in Melbourne, the son of Loretto Ellen (née Hare) and Frederic Thomas Schepisi, who was a fruit dealer and car salesman of Italian descent. He began his career in advertising and directed both commercials and documentaries before making his first feature film, The Devil's Playground, in 1976.

Schepisi won the Australian Film Institute Award for Best Direction and the Australian Film Institute Award for Best Screenplay for both The Devil's Playground and Evil Angels (released as A Cry in the Dark outside of Australia and New Zealand).

In 1991, Schepisi's film The Russia House was nominated for the Golden Bear at the 41st Berlin International Film Festival.

In 2005, Schepisi directed and co-produced the HBO miniseries Empire Falls, for which he was nominated for the Emmy Award for Outstanding Directing for a Miniseries, Movie or Dramatic Special and the Directors Guild of America Award for Best Director of a TV Film.

In 2007, he was the Chairman of the Jury at the 29th Moscow International Film Festival.

In April 2008, it was announced that Film Finance Corporation Australia was providing funding for Schepisi's film The Last Man, about the final days of the Vietnam War. It was scheduled to begin filming in Queensland, with Guy Pearce and David Wenham in leading roles, towards the end of the year.

In 2011, Schepisi directed The Eye of the Storm. Filmed in Melbourne, Sydney and Far North Queensland, and based on the novel by Patrick White, The Eye of the Storm stars Charlotte Rampling, Judy Davis and Geoffrey Rush. The story is about "children finally understanding themselves through the context of family".

In 2012, he directed Words and Pictures starring Juliette Binoche and Clive Owen. Schepisi has also directed a number of music videos, including for the 2008 song "Breathe" by Kaz James featuring Stu Stone.

Asked about the "gypsy-like existence" of a filmmaker, Schepisi has said: "It's the hardest thing. I think we're today's circus people. It's very hard on your family. [His wife] Mary travels with me and when everyone was younger and it was possible, I liked them to travel with me and be with me. Fortunately, Mary's an artist; she paints, and often finds inspiration from our locations." Schepisi has seven adult children and one grandchild.

Personal life
Fred Schepisi has been married three times and has seven children. He had four children with his first wife Joan; his second wife Rhonda died of cancer, after they had had two children.  His third wife, Mary, whom he married in 1984 and with whom he had a seventh child, is American.

He supports Australia becoming a republic and is a founding member of the Australian Republican Movement.

Filmography
The Devil's Playground (1976)
The Chant of Jimmie Blacksmith (1978)
Barbarosa (1982)
Iceman (1984)
Plenty (1985)
Roxanne (1987)
Evil Angels (A Cry in the Dark) (1988)
The Russia House (1990)
Mr. Baseball (1992)
Six Degrees of Separation (1993)
I.Q. (1994)
Fierce Creatures (1997)
Last Orders (2001)
It Runs in the Family (2003)
Empire Falls (2005)
The Eye of the Storm (2011)
Words and Pictures (2013)

Unmade films
Bitter Sweet (1979) – romance drama for Avco Embassy

References

External links
Official website

Facebook page
Twitter
OnlyMelbourne.com.au biography

1939 births
Living people
Australian republicans
Australian people of Italian descent
Australian film directors
Australian film producers
Australian screenwriters
Film directors from Melbourne
Officers of the Order of Australia